Adam Ťoupalík (born 9 May 1996) is a Czech cyclo-cross and road cyclist, who currently rides for UCI Continental team . He won the silver medal in the men's under-23 event at the 2016 UCI Cyclo-cross World Championships in Heusden-Zolder, being beaten in the sprint by Eli Iserbyt.

Major results

Cyclo-cross

2012–2013
 1st  National Junior Championships
 3rd  UCI World Junior Championships
2013–2014
 1st  National Junior Championships
 1st  Overall UCI Junior World Cup
1st Tábor
1st Heusden-Zolder
1st Rome
2nd Citadelcross
2nd Nommay
 2nd  UEC European Junior Championships
2014–2015
 1st  National Under-23Championships
2015–2016
 2nd  UCI World Under-23 Championships
 UCI Under-23 World Cup
3rd Heusden-Zolder
2017–2018
 UCI Under-23 World Cup
2nd Duinencross
 3rd National Championships
2021–2022
 3rd National Championships

Road

2013
 1st Mountains classification, Oberösterreich Juniorenrundfahrt
2014
 National Junior Road Championships
1st  Road race
1st  Time trial
 1st Mountains classification, Trofeo Karlsberg
 8th Time trial, UEC European Junior Road Championships
2016
 2nd Road race, National Under-23 Road Championships
 7th Overall Tour Alsace
2018
 1st Stage 3 Arctic Race of Norway
 2nd Road race, National Under-23 Road Championships
 4th Road race, National Road Championships
 6th Road race, UEC European Under-23 Road Championships
 6th Overall Boucles de la Mayenne
2019
 7th Skive–Løbet
 9th Himmerland Rundt
2020
 National Road Championships
1st  Road race
3rd Time trial
 4th Overall Czech Cycling Tour
 9th Road race, UEC European Road Championships
2021
 1st GP Czech Republic
 3rd Time trial, National Road Championships
 3rd GP Adria Mobil
 5th Overall Istrian Spring Trophy
 5th GP Slovenian Istria
 8th Overall Alpes Isère Tour
 9th Overall Sibiu Cycling Tour
2022
 1st Visegrad 4 Bicycle Race
 1st Visegrad 4 Kerekparverseny
 National Road Championships 
3rd Road race
4th Time trial
 6th Overall Okolo jižních Čech 
2023
 1st Trofej Umag

References

External links
 

1996 births
Living people
Cyclo-cross cyclists
Czech male cyclists
People from Tábor
Sportspeople from the South Bohemian Region